Andrew Currie (1812–1891) was a Scottish sculptor and antiquarian. His most noted works are the statue of James Hogg at St Mary's Loch (1860) (sometimes called the Ettrick Shepherd), the statue of Robert the Bruce on the esplanade at Stirling Castle (1876), and the figures of Edie Ochiltree and Old Mortality on the Scott Monument.

Life
Currie was born in the Ettrick Forest area, the son of a Howford sheep farmer, in 1812. He was apprenticed as a mill-wright in Denholm. He is known to have attended Yarrow church with James Hogg and knew him personally, adding greatly to the authenticity of his later statue to him.

After initially travelling south to London and working in the Chatham Dockyard Currie returned to Scotland in 1839 and continued to work as a mill-wright in Earlston until his forties when he began his career as a sculptor. He was aged 43 when he begin exhibiting at the Royal Scottish Academy. He exhibited from 1855 to 1877. Around 1857 he moved to Darnick, operating a workshop in the grounds of Darnick Tower.

Currie converted to Catholicism in 1864. He died in 1891 and is buried in Weirhill Cemetery in Melrose.

Other known works
Statue of Mungo Park in Selkirk (1859)
Edie Ochiltree, The Gaberlunzie man, (probably a practice-piece for the second Scott Monument figure), in the grounds of Scott's home, Abbotsford House.
Girl with Flowers, Edinburgh City Art Centre (1882).
Carved bookshelf, originally carved for Cowdenknowes House
Fairy Flower Stand, (wood-carving) exhibited RSA 1855, current whereabouts unknown
Side altar and pulpit, Our Lady and St Andrews Church, Galashiels
Moss Trooper, Netherby Hall
Fireplace and over-mantle exported to his brother, John Lang Currie, for his mansion in St Kilda, Melbourne

References

Carving History: The Life and Works of Andrew Currie by Bob Johnstone

External links

http://sites.scran.ac.uk/scottmon/pages/hisnovels/statues/david_dean.htm
http://www.thesouthernreporter.co.uk/what-s-on/borders-sculptor-s-memoirs-see-light-of-day-after-decades-down-under-1-2608054
http://sculpture.gla.ac.uk/view/person.php?id=msib6_1205753791

1813 births
1891 deaths
19th-century British sculptors
19th-century British male artists
19th-century Scottish people
Scottish sculptors
Scottish male sculptors
People from the Scottish Borders
Converts to Roman Catholicism
Scottish Roman Catholics